Bonda-palli is a village in Vizianagaram district of the Indian state of Andhra Pradesh, India.

Demography
Bondapalli Mandal has a population of 50,473 in 2001. Males constitute 24,950 and females 25,523 of the population. The average literacy rate is 44%, below the national average of 59.5%. The male literacy rate is 56% and that of females 32%.

References

External links

Villages in Vizianagaram district
Mandal headquarters in Vizianagaram district